Web search engines are listed in tables below for comparison purposes.  The first table lists the company behind the engine, volume and ad support and identifies the nature of the software being used as free software or proprietary software. The second and third table lists internet privacy aspects along with other technical parameters, such as whether the engine provides personalization (alternatively viewed as a filter bubble).

Defunct or acquired search engines are not listed here.

Search crawlers
Current search engines with independent crawlers, as of December 2018.

Digital rights

Tracking and surveillance

See also
 Comparison of webmail providers – often merged with web search engines by companies that host both services
 List of search engines
 Search engine privacy

External links 
 Gnod Search - A tool to compare results across many search engines

References

Web search engines
Network software comparisons